The Glass Ghost is the third extended play from British singer-songwriter Phildel. It was released on March 4, 2013 through Decca Records. The EP is a slight shift in sound from her first album, The Disappearance of the Girl, focusing on the incorporation of glassy, crystalline soundscapes and stripping back the use of beats.

Track listing

Notes
“My imagination is the biggest inspiration for my work,” says Phildel. “In my imagination, I guess because of my past, there’s a lot of dark imagery and sinister feelings."
Various videos of the album have been released on YouTube, featuring magical make-up looks designed and created by Klaire De Lys.

"Holes In Your Coffin" was originally named 'Coffin Nails' back in 2008.

References

2013 EPs
Decca Records albums